The Greek Basket League Most Improved Player, or Greek Basket League MIP, is an annual award for the Most Improved Player of each season of Greece's top-tier level professional basketball club league, the Greek Basket League.

Winners

References

External links
 Official Greek Basket League Site 
 Official Greek Basket League YouTube Channel 
 Official Hellenic Basketball Federation Site 
 Basketblog.gr 
 GreekBasketball.gr 

Greek Basket League
Most Improved Player
European basketball awards